KFNN (1510 AM) is a commercial radio station licensed to Mesa, Arizona, and serving the Phoenix metropolitan area.  It airs a financial news and talk radio format, broadcasting from studios in North Scottsdale. KFNN is owned by CRC Broadcasting Company, Inc., headed by Ronald Cohen and Brian DuBose.  The company also owns sports radio 1580 KQFN, as well as KPSF and KXPS in the Palm Springs area, and a financial expo company called Financial Fest. KFNN has a lineup of local and national money related programs, with some nationally syndicated conservative talk show hosts.  KFNN says it had the first full-time financial format of its kind in the U.S., starting in 1988. 

By day, KFNN is powered at 22,000 watts.  But because 1510 AM is a clear-channel frequency reserved for Class A WLAC Nashville, KFNN must reduce nighttime power to only 100 watts to prevent interference.  It uses a directional antenna at all times.  The transmitter is on Black Mountain Boulevard at Rough Rider Road in Phoenix.  KFNN can also be heard on FM translator K287BX at 105.3 MHz in Mesa.

History

Early Years
Maricopa County Broadcasters, owned by Sheldon Engel, built KALF in 1962.  The station signed on the air on November 2.  It was a daytimer, required to go off the air at sunset. In 1970, it was relaunched as KMND ("Command Radio"), simulcasting an easy listening music format with co-owned 93.3 KMND-FM. KMND-AM-FM was acquired by the Dwight-Karma Broadcasting Corporation in 1971.  The call signs switched KDKB and KDKB-FM, playing an Album Oriented Rock format.

In 1978, the simulcast was broken and 1510 AM flipped to an oldies sound of the 1950s and 60s.  The call letters were changed to KDJQ. In 1980, the format at AM KDJQ changed to new wave music for a brief time.

The station became KNTS on November 6, 1984. On August 23, 1986, the station changed its call sign to KJAA with a Spanish-language format.

KFNN
On December 12, 1988, 1510 AM changed its call sign to KFNN.  The format switched to all business and financial news.

The station's transmitter and towers at the time of the change were located in Mesa, its city of license as stated on its Federal Communications Commission license. It was originally a 10,000-watt daytime signal until 1991, when the station towers were relocated to North Phoenix.  From there the signal was authorized to increase to 22,000 watts daytime, and nighttime authorization was added.  In 2013, KFNN began simulcasting on FM, through translator station K257CD on 99.3 MHz. In 2017, the 99.3 translator began simulcasting co-owned KQFN's sports radio format.  KFNN's FM signal began using a new translator, K287BX on 105.3 MHz.

Business and financial format
Along with two other original partners, Ronald Cohen began the station's format with largely syndicated format from Bloomberg Radio and other radio networks.  But after several years, live, local programming began airing throughout the week.  Don McDonald's financial planning program was one of the first major national shows broadcast on the station, along with Ken and Daria Dolan, who featured a money and investment related program syndicated from the WOR Radio Network.

KFNN introduced a local wake up show, Business for Breakfast.  Ken Morgan was its original host.  He had been a long time morning show host and station manager, with much of his career spent in Cleveland.  Mark Asher is the current host.  Other national business and money shows heard on KFNN included Clark Howard, Gary Kaltbaum and Ray Lucia.

In 2011, KFNN re-branded from "1510 KFNN, Financial Newsradio" to "Money Radio 1510 & 99.3 FM." The station's brand was changed to reflect the broader nature of program content that relates to all matters money.  Some programs are also heard in the Palm Springs market on co-owned KPSF 1200 AM.  In 2019, KFNN began adding some conservative and libertarian-leaning political talk, including Todd Schnitt, Chris Plante, Michael J. Knowles and Ben Shapiro.  It airs Bloomberg Radio in the early morning, evenings and some weekend hours.  Some paid brokered programming is also on the schedule.  Most hours begin with an update from USA Radio News.

References

External links
FCC History Cards for KFNN
KFNN Website

FNN
Radio stations established in 1962
1962 establishments in Arizona
Business talk radio stations
Business mass media in the United States